Molotov cocktail is a generic name used for a variety of bottle-based improvised incendiary weapons. 

Molotov Cocktail may also refer to: 

Molotov Cocktail (magazine), a quarterly magazine published in South Africa
Molotov Cocktail Party, a 1994 album by post-hardcore band Frodus

See also
Cocktail Molotov, a 1980 French film
Molotov Cocktease, a fictional character from The Venture Bros.